Belur is a first-grade town panchayat in the Vazhapadi taluk of Salem district, in Tamil Nadu, India.

Geography
Belur is within Vazhapadi taluk, which is in the central part of the district. Belur is just south of the Kalrayan Hills, part of the Eastern Ghats. The town is within the drainage basin of the Vellar River, and the Anaimuduvu River, a tributary of the Vellar, flows through the town during the wet season. Tamil Nadu State Highway 160 runs through Belur.

Demographics
In 2011, Belur had a population of 8,736 people living in 2,290 households. The numbers of male and female inhabitants were almost completely equal, with 4,367 males and 4,369 females making up the population. 875 children, about 10% of the population, were at or below the age of 6. 6,198 inhabitants, or about 71% of the population, were literate. Scheduled Castes and Scheduled Tribes accounted for about 53% and 0.5% of the population, respectively.

References

Cities and towns in Salem district